Tancred ( 1075 – December 5 or December 12, 1112) was an Italo-Norman leader of the First Crusade who later became Prince of Galilee and regent of the Principality of Antioch. Tancred came from the house of Hauteville and was the great-grandson of Norman lord Tancred of Hauteville.

Biography

Early life

Tancred was a son of Emma of Hauteville and Odo the Good Marquis. His maternal grandparents were Robert Guiscard and Guiscard's first wife Alberada of Buonalbergo. Emma was also a sister of Bohemond I of Antioch.

First Crusade
In 1096, Tancred joined his maternal uncle Bohemond on the First Crusade, and the two made their way to Constantinople. There, he was pressured to swear an oath to Byzantine Emperor Alexius I Comnenus, promising to give back any conquered land to the Byzantine Empire. Although the other leaders did not intend to keep their oaths, Tancred refused to swear the oath altogether. He participated in the siege of Nicaea in 1097, but the city was taken by Alexius' army after secret negotiations with the Seljuk Turks. Because of this, Tancred was very distrustful of the Byzantines.

In 1097, the Crusaders divided their forces at Heraclea Cybistra and Tancred entered the Levant by passing south through the Cilician Gates. He displayed the skills of a brilliant strategist by seizing five of the most important sites in Cilicia Pedias, which included the ancient cities of Tarsus and Adana, the great emporium at Mopsuestia, and the strategic castles at Sarvandikar and Anazarbus. The last three settlements were annexed to the Principality of Antioch. During their fourteen-year occupation of Anazarbus the Crusaders built the magnificent donjon atop the center of the fortified outcrop. At Sarvandikar, which controlled the strategic Amanus Pass, Tancred imprisoned Raymond of Saint-Gilles in 1101/02. 

He assisted in the siege of Antioch in 1098. One year later, during the assault on Jerusalem, Tancred, along with Gaston IV of Béarn, claimed to have been the first Crusader to enter the city on July 15. (Alternative claim)  When the city fell, Tancred along with other crusading armies participated in the sacking of the city. his biographer Ralph of Caen is cited to have said that "Tancred was one of the most active participants in the decimation of the conquered Saracens.” During the final stages of the battle Tancred gave his banner to a group of the citizens who had fled to the roof of the Temple of Solomon. This should have assured their safety, but they were massacred, along with many others, during the sack of the city. The author of the Gesta Francorum (Deeds of the Franks) records that, when Tancred realized this, he was "greatly angered" However, his fury was calmed by the argument that the possibility of a counter-attack meant it was too dangerous for the citizens of Jerusalem to be left alive. When the Kingdom of Jerusalem was established, Tancred became Prince of Galilee.

Regent of Antioch
In 1100, Tancred became regent of Antioch when Bohemond was taken prisoner by the Danishmends at the Battle of Melitene. He expanded the territory of the Latin principality by capturing land from the Byzantines, although, over the next decade, Alexius attempted, unsuccessfully, to bring him under Byzantine control.  In 1104, he also took control of the County of Edessa when Baldwin II was taken captive after the Battle of Harran. After Baldwin's release in late 1108, he had to fight Tancred (probably early 1109) to regain control of the county; Tancred was eventually defeated and returned to Antioch. After Harran, Bohemond returned to Europe to recruit more Crusaders, again leaving his nephew as regent in Antioch. Tancred's victory over Radwan of Aleppo at the Battle of Artah in 1105 allowed the Latin principality to recover some its territories east of the Orontes River.

In 1108, Tancred refused to honour the Treaty of Devol, in which Bohemond swore an oath of fealty to Alexius, and for decades afterwards Antioch remained independent of the Byzantine Empire. In late September 1108, near Turbessel, Tancred, with 1,500 Frankish knights and infantry, and 600 Turkish horsemen sent by Fakhr al-Mulk Ridwan confronted Baldwin II and the 2,000 men of Jawali Saqawa, atabeg of Mosul. Tancred and Ridwan routed Jawali's men, who took refuge in Turbessel. Later on, Tancred who had initially refused to abandon Turbessel to Baldwin II, decided at the assembly in Château Pèlerin in April 1109, to give up Turbessel in return for his restoration to his old domains in the Kingdom of Jerusalem.

In 1110, he brought Krak des Chevaliers under his control, which would later become an important castle in the County of Tripoli. Tancred remained the regent of Antioch for Bohemond II until his death in 1112 during a typhoid epidemic. He had married Cecile of France, but died childless.

The Gesta Tancredi is a biography of Tancred written in Latin by Ralph of Caen, a Norman who joined the First Crusade and served under Tancred and Bohemond. An English translation was co-published in 2005 by Bernard S. Bachrach and David S. Bachrach.

In fiction

Tancred appears as a character in Torquato Tasso's 16th-century poem Jerusalem Delivered, in which he is portrayed as an epic hero and given a fictional love interest, the pagan warrior-maiden Clorinda. He is also loved by the Princess Erminia of Antioch. Portions of Tasso's verses were set by Claudio Monteverdi in his 1624 dramatic work Il Combattimento di Tancredi e Clorinda. He also appears in one of the scenes in Imre Madách's The Tragedy of Man. In Tom Harper's Siege of Heaven he is depicted as a violent psychopath. His portrayal is similar although slightly more humorous in Alfred Duggan's novel Count Bohemond.

Tancred also appears as one of the Crusade leaders in Sir Walter Scott's novel Count Robert of Paris who returned to Constantinople from Scutari to ensure a fair contest between Count Robert and his challenger. The novel Tancred, or the New Crusade by Benjamin Disraeli centres around the adventures of an imagined modern descendant and namesake of the Prince of Galilee. Rossini's opera Tancredi is based on Tasso, via Voltaire's play Tancrède of 1759.

Notes

References

Sources
Edwards, Robert W., The Fortifications of Armenian Cilicia: Dumbarton Oaks Studies XXIII, Washington, D.C.: Dumbarton Oaks, Trustees for Harvard University (1987). 
 
Robert Lawrence Nicholson, Tancred: A Study of His Career and Work. AMS Press, 1978.
Peters, Edward, ed., The First Crusade: The Chronicle of Fulcher of Chartres and Other Source Materials, (Philadelphia: University of Pennsylvania Press, 1998)
 Smail, R. C. Crusading Warfare 1097–1193. New York: Barnes & Noble Books, (1956) 1995.

External links
  Gesta Tancredi
 

Christians of the First Crusade
Princes of Galilee
Deaths from typhoid fever
Torquato Tasso characters
Italo-Normans
Norman warriors
1075 births
1112 deaths
Hauteville family